Mehrab Mirza was the self-declared Shah of Shirvan after the death of Burhan Ali.

Life 
He was chosen by rebel leaders as the next pretender after the sudden death of Burhan Ali. His exact relationship to the former shahs is unknown but he is believed to be member of the dynasty of Shirvanshahs. He advanced with his army as far as Sığnax, but was defeated and fled Shirvan.

References 

Year of birth unknown
16th-century Iranian people